The Walter Schottky Prize is a scientific prize awarded by the German Physical Society for outstanding research work of young academics in the field of solid-state physics. Since 1973 the prize is generally awarded annually. The endowment of the prize with 10,000 euros is contributed by Infineon Technologies AG and Robert Bosch GmbH. The prize is dedicated to Walter Schottky, a physicist and pioneer of electronics.

List of recipients 
Source: German Physical Society

 2021: Andreas Hüttel
 2020: Zhe Wang
 2019: Eva Vera Benckiser 
 2018: Sascha Schäfer 
 2017: Helmut Schultheiss
 2016: Ermin Malic
 2015: Frank Pollmann, Andreas Schnyder
 2014: Sven Höfling
 2013: Claus Ropers
 2012: Alex Greilich
 2011: not awarded
 2010: Thomas Seyller
 2009: Florian Marquardt
 2008: Fedor Jelezko
 2007: Jonathan Finley
 2006: Manfred Fiebig
 2005: Wolfgang Belzig
 2004: Markus Morgenstern
 2003: Jurgen Smet
 2002: Harald Reichert
 2001: Manfred Bayer
 2000: Clemens Bechinger
 1999: Thomas Herrmannsdörfer
 1998: Achim Wixforth
 1997: Christoph Geibel
 1996: Bo Persson
 1995: Jochen Feldmann
 1994: Paul Müller
 1993: Gertrud Zwicknagl
 1992: Kurt Kremer
 1991: Christian Thomsen
 1990: Hermann Grabert, Helmut Wipf
 1989: Ulrich Eckern, Gerd Schön, Wilhelm Zwerger
 1988: Martin Stutzmann
 1987: Bernd Ewen, Dieter Richter
 1986: Gerhard Abstreiter
 1985: Hans Werner Diehl, Siegfried Dietrich
 1984: Gottfried Döhler
 1983: Klaus Sattler
 1982: Volker Dohm, Reinhard Folk
 1981: Klaus von Klitzing
 1980: Klaus Funke
 1979: Heiner Müller-Krumbhaar
 1978: Bernhard Authier, Horst Fischer
 1977: Siegfried Hunklinger
 1976: Franz Wegner
 1975: Karl-Heinz Zschauer
 1974: Andreas Otto
 1973: Peter Ehrhart

See also

 List of physics awards

References 

Awards of the German Physical Society